Bronisław Dankowski (22 August 1944 – 2 December 2020) was a Polish politician who served as a member of the Sejm.

References

1944 births
2020 deaths
Polish politicians